Cardiocrinum is a genus of bulbous plants of the lily family first described in 1846. They are native to the Himalaya, China, the Russian Far East, and Japan. The bulbs are usually formed at the soil surface. The preferred habitat is woodland. The plants tend to be monocarpic, dying after flowering.

Description 

Cardiocrinum is a genus of monocarpic perennial herbs.

Taxonomy 

Cardiocrinum was originally described by Endlicher in 1836 as one of five sections of Lilium, to which it is closely related. Later authors considered it a separate genus. The common name is giant lilies. They differ from Lilium in some characteristics, most notably in the heart shaped leaves. The genus name alludes to these leaves, from the Greek kardia, heart, and krinon, lily.

The Himalayan species Cardiocrinum giganteum is the largest of any of the lily plants, growing up to 3.5 metres high.

Species 

The genus Cardiocrinum is endemic to East Asia and has three species, two of which occur in China.

References

Bibliography

Books

Articles

Websites 

 
 
 
 
 

Liliaceae
Liliaceae genera
Taxa named by Stephan Endlicher